Milltown is an unincorporated community in Sebastian County, Arkansas, United States.

The Milltown Bridge in Milltown is listed on the National Register of Historic Places.

References

Unincorporated communities in Sebastian County, Arkansas
Unincorporated communities in Arkansas